The Flowerpot Men were a British electronic music group active in the 1980s. This group featured electronic musician Ben Watkins (of Juno Reactor), Paul N. Davies (of Naked Lunch), and cellist Adam Peters.

Works 
They recorded several EPs including Alligator Bait, Jo's So Mean and The Janice Long Session. The EP Jo's So Mean was produced by Siouxsie and the Banshees' co-founder Steven Severin who described it as "a proto-techno classic". Their most successful and well-known song, "Beat City", was featured in the 1986 film Ferris Bueller's Day Off.

Prior to the Flowerpot Men, Adam Peters had played cello and piano parts on some Echo & the Bunnymen tracks including "Never Stop" and "The Killing Moon".

The group later became known as Sunsonic and released the full-length LP Melting Down on Motor Angel in 1990.

Post Flowerpot Men 
After Sunsonic, Ben Watkins went on to form Juno Reactor, a multifaceted project that has released seven studio albums, scored Hollywood films, and toured with multiple live bands and stage performers.

Adam Peters became a composer for feature films, documentaries, and television.

Discography
Jo's So Mean (1984), Compost Records
"Walk on Gilded Splinters" (1985), Compost Records
Alligator Bait EP (1987), Compost Records
The Janice Long Session (1987), Strange Fruit
"Watching the Pharoahs" (1987), Link

References

English electronic music groups
English new wave musical groups